Manuel de Alencar Guimarães (December 13, 1865 - September 9, 1940) best known as Alencar Guimarães was a Brazilian lawyer and politician, senator of Paraná from 1908 until 1911, and again from 1912 until 1920.

References

1865 births
1940 deaths
Politicians from Curitiba
Members of the Federal Senate (Brazil)